O’Higgins may refer to:

People
O'Higgins (surname), lists notable people with the surname
O'Higgins family

Places
O'Higgins Region, Chile
O'Higgins, Chile, commune in the Capitán Prat Province, Aysén Region, Chile
Villa O'Higgins, the capital of the O'Higgins commune
Base General Bernardo O'Higgins Riquelme, Antarctica
O'Higgins Park, Santiago, Chile
O'Higgins Glacier, a glacier in the Southern Patagonian Ice Field
, a locality in Buenos Aires province, Argentina
, a locality in the province of Córdoba, Argentina
, Chaco province, Argentina
Hotel O'Higgins, Viña del Mar, Chile

Sports
O'Higgins  F.C., a football club from Rancagua, Chile
O'Higgins Braden, a defunct football club from Rancagua, Chile, one of the founder members of O'Higgins  F.C.

Ships
Chilean ship O'Higgins, several ships operated by the Chilean Navy:
 , a Chilean frigate commanded by Thomas Cochrane, Lord Cochrane
 
 
 , ex-

Other uses
Instituto O'Higgins de Rancagua, a private Catholic school located in the center of Rancagua, Chile
Order of Bernardo O'Higgins, an award issued by Chile awarded to non-Chilean citizens
 O'Higgins disease, a name for Argentine hemorrhagic fever, from the Buenos Aires locality
 2351 O'Higgins, a minor planet